Nicolae Țîu (born 25 March 1948) is a Moldovan politician who was Foreign Minister of Moldova between 1990 and 1993.

References
Nicolae Țâu la 60 de ani: Biobibliogr. / Univ. Liberă Intern. din Moldova; alcăt.: Tatiana Kalguțkin, Elena Țurcan; red. șt.: Ludmila Corghenci; red. bibliogr.: Valentina Chitoroagă. – Ch.: ULIM, 2008. –64 p. – (Col. "Universitaria"; Fasc. a 30-a)

External links
www.mfa.md - official minister site

 

Living people
Moldovan diplomats
Foreign ministers of Moldova
Members of the Congress of People's Deputies of the Soviet Union
Recipients of the Order of Honour (Moldova)
1948 births